Pyrgus alpinus is a butterfly of the  family Hesperiidae. It is found from Ghissar to western China and northern India.

Subspecies
Pyrgus alpinus alpinus
Pyrgus alpinus alichurensis de Jong, 1975 (southern and eastern Pamirs)
Pyrgus alpinus mustagatae Alberti, 1952 (Chinese eastern Pamirs)

References

Butterflies described in 1874
Pyrgus
Butterflies of Asia